Lars Weibel (born May 20, 1974) is a retired Swiss ice hockey goaltender who played for several teams in the Swiss National League A.  He also represented the Switzerland men's national ice hockey team on several occasions in the World Junior Championships, World Championships and Olympics.

External links

1974 births
Living people
Chicago Blackhawks draft picks
EHC Biel players
EV Zug players
HC Lugano players
HC Davos players
Kölner Haie players
SC Rapperswil-Jona Lakers players
Swiss ice hockey goaltenders
Olympic ice hockey players of Switzerland
Ice hockey players at the 2002 Winter Olympics